Hisham Mohammad Abdul-Munam is a retired Jordanian footballer of Palestinian origin who played for Al-Wehdat SC and the Jordan national football team. 
 
Hisham has an older brother named Jihad, who also played for Al-Wehdat SC and the Jordan national team. Hisham is married and has four children; a daughter named Aseen, three sons, one named Ahmed, who played also for Al-Wehdat  , and the other two Jihad and Ayham.

Career
Hisham retired when he was just 31 years old. A match was held between Al-Faisaly and Al-Wehdat on 6 August 2000 to mark his retirement.

International goals

U-23

Senior Team

Honors and Participation in International Tournaments

In Pan Arab Games 
1992 Pan Arab Games

In Arab Nations Cup 
1992 Arab Nations Cup

References
 Addustour
 alweehdat.net

External links 
 

1969 births
Living people
Jordanian footballers
Jordan international footballers
Jordanian people of Palestinian descent
Association football defenders
Al-Wehdat SC players
Al-Wehdat SC managers
Sportspeople from Amman
Jordanian football managers
Jordanian Pro League managers
Jordanian Pro League players